Storax (stúrax), often commercially sold as styrax, is a natural resin isolated from the wounded bark of Liquidambar orientalis Mill. (Asia Minor) and Liquidambar styraciflua L. (Central America) (Hamamelidaceae). It is distinct from benzoin (also called "storax"), a similar resin obtained from the Styracaceae plant family.

Composition
Purified storax contains circa 33 to 50% storesin, an alcoholic resin, both free and as cinnamic esters. Contains 5 to 15% cinnamic acid, 5 to 15% cinnamyl cinnamate, circa 10% phenylpropyl cinnamate; small amounts of ethyl cinnamate, benzyl cinnamate, and styrene, Some may contain traces of vanillin. Some sources report a resin containing triterpenic acids (oleanolic and 3-epioleanolic acids).

Uses
Storax has a pleasant, floral/lilac, leathery, balsamic smell. Storax and its derivatives (resinoid, essential oil, absolute) are used as flavors, fragrances, and in pharmaceuticals (Friar's Balsam).

American storax resin (Liquidambar styraciflua) is chewed like gum to freshen breath and clean teeth.

History
Mnesimachus, Aristotle, Theophrastus (Historia Plantarum), Herodotus, and Strabo are the first ones to mention the storax tree and its balsam. In ancient Greece, storax also denoted the spike at the lower end of a spearshaft.

Pliny (Historia Naturalis 12.98, 15.26; 24.24) notes the use of storax as a perfume, while Scribonius Largus drank wine flavored with storax. Ciris mentions storax as a fragrant hair dye. Dioscorides (De materia medica 1.79) reports its use as incense, similar to frankincense, having expectorant and soothing properties.

The 10th century Arab historian al-Masudi listed storax gum (mayʿa) as a spice in his book Murūdj al-dhahab (Meadows of Gold).

Chao Ju-Kuan, a 13th century trade commissioner in Fukien province, described liquid storax gum as a product of Ta-shï (the Arabs).

Linnaeus, who determined the scientific names of plants, thought that storax was extracted from the tree called in modern Hebrew livneh refu'i which he termed Styrax officinalis. However in the light of tests made in Israel it is very doubtful if a sap with medicinal or aromatic qualities can be extracted from this tree. The storax of the ancients was probably extracted from a different tree, seemingly from the Liquidambar orientalis which grows wild in northern Syria, and may even have been grown in Israel; from it is extracted an aromatic sap with healing qualities called storax liquidis. This may possibly be the biblical balm, though other sources conclude that the biblical balm is Balsam (opobalsamum).

Styrax benzoin is a more humid Asian species, reported from India, Cambodia, Laos, Myanmar, Thailand, Vietnam, Java, Sumatra, and Malaysia. Thus, this species historically would have needed to be imported from outside Israel.

In the nineteenth century, styrene was isolated by distillation of storax balsam.

In North Africa, for mystical purposes, women burn benzoin and storax in potsherds.

Safety
Storax resin is "generally regarded as safe" (GRAS), but at low levels, for example, circa 15 ppm in candy and 25 ppm in baked goods.

References

Resins
Essential oils
Liquidambar
Incense material
Perfume ingredients